Bravely Default II is a role-playing video game developed by Claytechworks and published by Square Enix. It was released worldwide for the Nintendo Switch on February 26, 2021, with Nintendo publishing the game on the platform outside of Japan, and was released for Windows on September 2, 2021. It is the third main installment in the Bravely series, following the original Bravely Default and its direct sequel Bravely Second: End Layer. It features a separate story, setting, and cast of characters.

Premise and gameplay
Bravely Default II is the third main game in the Bravely series, following the original game Bravely Default and its sequel Bravely Second: End Layer. While Second was a direct story continuation from the original, Bravely Default II features a new story and cast of characters. Similar to prior titles, the game plays as a role-playing video game with turn-based battles. The game contains an updated variant of the prior games' "Brave Point" system and use of collecting different "asterisks" to change a character's job class.

Plot
Bravely Default II is set in a new world from prior games, on a continent named Excillant divided into five different kingdoms. The game follows four main characters; a mysterious young sailor named Seth, a refugee princess named Gloria, a traveling scholar named Elvis, and a mercenary named Adelle.  The party sets off across the continent to retrieve the crystals of the four elements. These crystals were stolen from Gloria's destroyed homeland of Musa.  Meanwhile, Elvis is trying to decipher an ancient book that cannot be read under normal circumstances, but occasionally reveals secrets of the past when it comes into contact with an Asterisk, which are powerful magical gems that grant knowledge and power. The book doubles as the system the player uses to save their progress.

During their travels, the four become this age's Heroes of Light, fighting to prevent the misuse of the crystals by warriors of the Kingdom of Holograd, its leader Adam, and his advisor Edna. Periodically throughout the world's history, an ancient evil called the Night's Nexus must be sealed away, and the crystals choose four warriors to do so. Seth is chosen by the Wind Crystal, Gloria by the Water Crystal, Elvis by the Earth Crystal, and Adelle by the Fire Crystal.  As the adventure continues, Adelle reveals that she is actually a fairy and that Edna is her sister. Edna hates humans and is trying to summon the Night's Nexus to destroy them all. Edna is the one who stole the Asterisks from the realm of the fairies to distribute to Holograd's forces, used them to empower Holograd's forces to seize the crystals through conquest or influence, and let humans drain the crystals' power on frivolous matters rather than their true purpose of suppressing the Nexus.

The four main characters, after having collected all the four crystals, battle and defeat Edna. Gloria sacrifices her life to empower the crystals again and seal the Night's Nexus away, continuing the cycle of previous Heroes of Light. While the end credits are displayed, this is a "bad ending", and the player is expected to continue onward.  Upon the player deciding to continue, Gloria's sacrifice is shown to be merely a vision of a possible future which the group witnesses within Elvis's mysterious book. While Gloria is fine sacrificing herself to save the world, Seth vows to find another way to destroy the Night's Nexus. Allowing it to awaken in Excillant and attacking it, however, only leads to another "bad ending" as the Night's Nexus continually regenerates itself despite the party's best efforts. After scouring the world for every Asterisk, the four learn that the book contains the memories of the Night's Nexus and that the Night's Nexus was once a human woman who attempted to consume all information in the world and went insane. As long as the book remains intact, the Night's Nexus can never be permanently destroyed. The player is able to wipe away the Night's Nexus's "save data" within the book, allowing for her to be truly defeated. The party travels across the ocean separating dimensions to the Nexus's lair and the four emerge victorious, defeating the Nexus completely.

Development
The game was announced for the Nintendo Switch at The Game Awards in December 2019. Series producer Tomoya Asano stated that the reason for the game's title, Bravely Default II, was due to his belief that Bravely Second did not live up to fans' expectations, and its critical and commercial underperformance made it difficult for the team to continue on the series. Team morale and finances improved following the release of the Japan-only mobile title Bravely Default: Fairy's Effect and the 2018 Nintendo Switch title Octopath Traveler, and the team decided to return to the series with a fresh start, with a game more similar to the original Default game instead. Revo, who composed the soundtrack for Default but did not return for Second, was announced to return for Default II.

A demo of the game was announced and released on March 26, 2020, following a Nintendo Direct Mini presentation. Square Enix announced that they would be taking fan feedback from the demo and implementing it into the final release. The demo features a story not featured in the final game.  The demo was generally praised, though many publications noted that the demo was more difficult than expected.

Reception

The game received generally positive reviews upon release. IGNs Seth Macy commended the game for continuing the battle and Job systems from the previous titles, its customization and strategy, and its tough but rewarding boss battles. However, he expresses disappointment in the sidequests and dungeon designs. GameSpots Steve Watts lamented some of the changes to the battle system, chiefly the removal of automated battles, thus making grinding more arduous. Game Informers Daniel Tack expressed similar praise for the battle and Job systems and found the experience fulfilling overall, but formulaic to the point of being dull at points. RPGamers Anna Marie Privitere singled out the lack of a quest log and the imbalance of some Job classes as negatives, but overall concluded that Bravely Default II was her favorite game in the series thus far.

The game's presentation was generally praised by outlets. Macy called the visuals "jaw-droppingly beautiful" while adding that "the upgrade to the Switch has lost a little of their charm from the tiny worlds of the 3DS, and each location is stunning in HD". Watts expressed similar praise, adding "anytime I got access to a new job, I would immediately play dolls with my four heroes, seeing each of their unique looks in the new outfits". Tack called the visuals "all over the place," pointing out the contrast between some that were "quite picturesque and memorable" with strong lighting, and others that were "drab caves, earthy sprawls, and undercityscapes," concluding that the overworlds were merely to serve as a backdrop for enemy encounters. Privitere praised the "lush environments ranging from grasslands to deserts and icy valleys to volcanic mountain heights". However, she commented that the chibi-styled character models, while not unattractive, were not quite so distinct compared to similar smaller-scale titles on the Nintendo Switch.

Sales
In August 2021, just prior to the release of the PC version of the game, Square Enix announced that the Switch version of the game had shipped over 950,000 copies worldwide. On December 22, 2021, Square Enix announced that Bravely Default II has sold a million copies.

Future

In 2021, series producer Tomoya Asano stated that the game was well-enough received to work on further entries in the series, but that a sequel was likely 3–4 years out.

References

External links
 
 

2021 video games
Nintendo Switch games
Role-playing video games
Fantasy video games
Nintendo games
Windows games
Square Enix games
Video game sequels
Video games developed in Japan
Japanese role-playing video games
Single-player video games
Unreal Engine games
Video games with alternate endings
Bravely